65 Aurigae is a binary star system located 252 light years away from the Sun in the northern constellation of Auriga. It is visible to the naked eye as a faint, orange hued star with an apparent visual magnitude of 5.12. The primary, designated component A, is an aging giant star with a stellar classification of K0 III. It is 3.31 billion years old and has expanded to 13 times the Sun's radius after exhausting the hydrogen at its core. The pair are moving further from the Earth with a heliocentric radial velocity of 22 km/s.

References

External links
 HR 2793
 CCDM J07220+3646
 Image 65 Aurigae

K-type giants
Binary stars
Auriga (constellation)
Durchmusterung objects
Aurigae, 65
057264
035710
2793